Sport Águila is a Peruvian football club, playing in the city of Huancayo, Junín.

History
In the 2007 Copa Perú, the club classified to the National Stage, but was eliminated by Juan Aurich of Chiclayo in the finals.

In May 2010, IDUNSA and Sport Águila withdrew before the start of the 2010 Segunda División Peruana season being relegated to the Copa Perú.

Honours

National
Copa Perú: 0
Runner-up (1): 2007

Regional
Región VI:
Winners (2): 2007, 2014

Liga Departamental de Junín:
Winners (2): 2013, 2016
Runner-up (1): 2007

Liga Provincial de Huancayo:
Runner-up (1): 2013

Liga Distrital de Huancán:
Winners (2): 2007, 2013

See also
List of football clubs in Peru
Peruvian football league system

Football clubs in Peru
Association football clubs established in 1947